Group F of the women's football tournament at the 2016 Summer Olympics was played from 3 to 9 August 2016, and included Australia, India, Germany and Zimbabwe. The top two teams advanced to the knockout stage, while the third-placed team Australia also advanced because they were among the two best third-placed teams among all three groups.

All times are BRT (UTC−3).

Teams

Standings

Matches

Canada vs Australia

Zimbabwe vs Germany

Canada vs Zimbabwe

Germany vs Australia

Germany vs Canada

Australia vs Zimbabwe

References

External links
Football – Women, Rio2016.com
Women's Olympic Football Tournament, Rio 2016, FIFA.com

Group F